Hajjiabad (also Romanized as Ḩājjīābād; also known as Ḩājīābād) is a village in Chaharkuh Rural District, in the Central District of Kordkuy County, Golestan Province, Iran. Its population was 295 in 66 families at the 2006 census.

References 

Populated places in Kordkuy County